Madan Mani Dixit (February 17, 1923 – August 15, 2019) was a Nepalese writer, journalist and novelist. His novel Madhabi is considered a classic in Nepali literature. He received the prestigious Madan Puraskar and Sajha Puraskar for the novel.

Early life and education 

He was born on February 17, 1923, in Kathmandu. He grew up in one of the most powerful families in Kathmandu. Madan Mani's father and grandfather held diplomatic positions during the rule of the Ranas. Madan Mani studied, from the age of eight, religious literature such as the Ramayana in Sanskrit. He was educated at Banaras Hindu University in India.

Career 
He started his career as a Headmaster at TriJuddha High School, Birgunj. From 1958 to 1960 he worked as an editor for Haal Khabar, a weekly newspaper. He was also the chief editor of Samichya, his own newspaper.

Madan Mani Dixit wrote with clear perspectives in mind. He drew from past experiences of his study of Sanskrit, philosophy, and history to write stories and novels flavored with scholastic insights. He believed that the most important aspect of story writing was not the style one writes in, but the feelings one is able to convey. One should be able to create an atmosphere suited to the period depicted.

In 1960, he was part of a parliamentary delegation to the Soviet Union, representing the journalistic sector of Nepal. He worked for thirty-three years for the Nepal Communist party. He also served as vice chancellor of the Royal Nepal Academy (1994-1999).

His most famous works included the novels Madhavi, Meri Nilima, Bhumisukta, and the short story Kasle jityo kasle haryo?. Madan Mani Dixit received various honors and awards, including the Madan Puraskar and the Adikavi Bhanubhakta Puraskar.

Death 
Dixit died on 15 August 2019, aged 96.

See also 

 Dhanush Chandra Gautam
 Bhawani Bhikshu
 Parijat
 Gopal Prasad Rimal
 Hridaya Chandra Singh Pradhan
 Taranath Sharma
 Madhav Prasad Ghimire

References

1923 births
2019 deaths
Nepalese male writers
Madan Puraskar winners
Nepalese male novelists
Male novelists
20th-century Nepalese writers
20th-century male writers
20th-century novelists
21st-century Nepalese writers
21st-century novelists
21st-century male writers
People from Kathmandu
Heads of schools in Nepal
Sajha Puraskar winners